Servage may refer to:
 Servage AB, Public traded Swedish IT firm
 Servage Hosting, an Internet hosting service
 Slavery